Jesús Marcelo Andrés Cuellar (born December 28, 1986) is an Argentine professional boxer. He held the WBA (Regular) featherweight title from 2015 to 2016, and has challenged once for the WBA (Super) super featherweight title in 2018.

Amateur career
Cuellar had an amateur record of 230 wins and 10 losses, and was a member of the Argentina national team.

Professional career

WBA featherweight champion
Cuellar was trained by former world champion and 2012 Trainer of the Year, Robert García.

Cuellar vs. Marrero 
On August 23, 2013, Cuellar defeated Claudio Marrero for the WBA interim featherweight title, in a close fight. Cuellar was the more aggressive fighter and scored a knockdown in the 6th round.

Cuellar vs. Mares 
On December 10, 2016, Cuellar defended his WBA Regular featherweight title against Abner Mares who was ranked #6 by the WBA at featherweight. Mares defeated Cuellar via split decision, scoring 117-110, 116-111 and 112-115 on the scorecards.

Cuellar vs. Davis 
In his next bout Cuellar fought WBA #3 Gervonta Davis for the vacant WBA Super super featherweight title. Davis knocked Cuellar down three times en route to a third round knockout win to win the WBA title.

Cuellar vs. Fortuna 
On November 2, 2019, Cuellar faced Javier Fortuna. Fortuna dominated Cuellar and dropped him twice en route to a second round knockout win.

Professional boxing record

References

External links

Jesus Cuellar - Profile, News Archive & Current Rankings at Box.Live

World featherweight boxing champions
World Boxing Association champions
1986 births
Living people
Argentine male boxers
South American Games gold medalists for Argentina
South American Games medalists in boxing
Super-featherweight boxers
Competitors at the 2006 South American Games